Coccotorus is a genus of true weevils in the beetle family Curculionidae. There are about six described species in Coccotorus.

Species
These six species belong to the genus Coccotorus:
 Coccotorus chaoi Chen, 1993 c
 Coccotorus hirsutus Bruner, 1888 i g
 Coccotorus pruniphilus Chittenden, 1925 i c b
 Coccotorus pumilae (Brown, 1966) i b
 Coccotorus requiescens Scudder, 1893 c
 Coccotorus scutellaris (LeConte, 1858) i b (plum gouger)
Data sources: i = ITIS, c = Catalogue of Life, g = GBIF, b = Bugguide.net

References

Further reading

 
 
 
 

Curculioninae
Articles created by Qbugbot